Daniel Nii Kwartei Titus Glover (born 28 August 1966) is a Ghanaian politician and the Member of Parliament of Tema East constituency. He is a member of the New Patriotic Party and the Deputy Minister of Transport in Ghana.

Early life 
Glover was born on 28 August 1966 in Asere-Ga Mashie in the Greater Accra Region.

Education 
Glover had a year of secondary education at the Nungua Presbyterian Secondary School in 1981. He studied for and obtained his ordinary level certificate at the Presbyterian Boy's Senior High School, Legon between 1982 and 1986. He continued at the Accra Academy privately from 1987 to 1988 and obtained his Advanced Level Certificate. Glover holds a master's degree from Warwick University, Coventry. He also has a certificate of higher education from Ruskin College, Oxford, and a certificate in labour studies from University of Cape Coast.

Personal life 
He is a member of the Miracle Life Gospel Church. He is married with four children.

Politics 
Glover is a member of the New Patriotic Party (NPP). In 2012, he won the Tema East seat on the NPP ticket for the sixth parliament of the fourth republic.

He  contested in the 2020 Ghanaian general election as the parliamentary candidate for the New Patriotic Party. and lost his seat to his National Democratic Congress (Ghana) opponent, Isaac Ashai Odamtten

Employment 
He works as a human resources manager for Ken City Media Ltd.

He is a manager/administrator/HR practitioner.

References

Ghanaian MPs 2017–2021
Living people
New Patriotic Party politicians
Ghanaian MPs 2013–2017
People from Greater Accra Region
Government ministers of Ghana
1966 births
Presbyterian Boys' Senior High School alumni